, also known as Japanese marching bands, and known historically as  or  are a type of elaborately-costumed street musicians in Japan who advertise for shops and other establishments. , both historically and in the present day, advertise the opening of new stores or other venues, or promote special events such as price discounts. In modern-day Japan,  are a rare sight, having been usurped by other forms of advertising in media such as magazines, on television and on the Internet.

Etymology

History

Origin as single performers in Osaka
Musical street performers have a long history in Japan, with a range of practices, from the founder of kabuki, Izumo no Okuni, to the  mendicant monks of the Fuke school of Zen Buddhism.

Amekatsu, who was known for his strong voice, became well-known in the city, and thus began to advertise for other stores as well as his own, doing so wearing a large hat, straw sandals and a belt with small bells attached to it, using a wooden  noisemaker to draw people's attention. Amekatsu was succeeded by a former bath attendant, Isamikame, who also used to shout  (lit., "East-West", equivalent to "listen up" or "come one, come all"). Subsequently, such advertising street performers were called  in Osaka up to World War II. He soon received competition from another advertiser called Maemoto, and they split their business, with one covering the Uemachi region and the other covering the Shinmachi region of Osaka. After Maemoto died in 1891, his brother, also called Maemoto took over the business, and he was soon joined by his son and daughter, probably the first female . Maemoto is also famous as being the first person in Osaka to die from electric shock in 1893. Other well-known performers from this time are Tanbataya Kurimaru, a former sweet chestnut seller, and Satsumaya Imosuke, a former bean seller. These two also occasionally added a second performer to their band.

Group performers in Tokyo
At the beginning of the Meiji period, such advertising was still unknown in Tokyo, with advertising still mainly done via curtains, billboards, and flyers. Stalls also advertised for themselves by making noise and wearing colorful clothes, a widely known example of the time being the extremely colorfully-dressed pharmacist Iwashiya. During this time, newspapers and posters also started to appear in Japan, and were subsequently used for advertising. The military also started to popularize western style marching bands, and at the same time public bands started to appear. In 1885, an advertising agency in Tokyo, Hiromeya (wide eyes), hired musicians for advertising. Hiromeya was founded by a former  from Osaka named Akita Ryukichi. He soon found out that a one-person band was not as popular in Tokyo as in Osaka, and hired larger bands of more than 10 performers for advertising purposes, following the popularity of military and public bands. His band also provided entertainment at festivals and parties, and also created background music for silent films. He was also hired by the Kirin beer company, whose advertising campaign spread out to Osaka. In Osaka, this form of group bands was yet unknown, as only individual performers were hired for advertising. The police also had to stop some of the larger performances in Osaka, as they hindered traffic, partially due to the -tall beer bottle the group was equipped with. The Hiromeya business grew, and they were even asked to perform at the burial of Emperor Meiji in 1912. The business still exists nowadays, although they now do mainly decorations.

Evolution of the modern 
Tanbataya Kurimaru and Satsumaya Imosuke in Osaka were inspired by the bands of Hiromeya during the Kirin advertising campaign. They enlarged their groups and equipped them with drums and even fancier clothes, often matching the products of the advertised shop. However, they neglected rhythm and quality of the music over volume, and occasionally got arrested by the police. Some bigger engagements lasted for up to six months and reached Kyūshū and Shikoku.

By 1920, advertising by hot-air balloon and airplane had begun in Japan, with both carrying large advertising banners through the air; at around the same time, neon signs began to appear in Tokyo. With the appearance of sound film in Japan in 1929, about 3,000 street advertisers in Japan lost their jobs. A strike in 1930 had no effect on this and did not improve the situation. The great depression in 1930 reduced the ' in Japan even more, and during World War II street performances were forbidden altogether.

The golden age
The  had a revival again between 1946 and 1956, and between 1950 and 1960 there were up to 2,500  active in Japan. They often performed on black markets. One well known group in Osaka was Aozora Gakudan, founded by former actor Saeki Yosan. This group played with up to 18 members, and many other  joined the group.

Decline
Since the 1960s the number of  has declined again, accelerated by the 1973 oil crisis with the subsequent recession. Around 1970, street performances were also banned in many large cities, as they hindered the traffic. In 1985 there remained around 150 , with an average age of about 60 years. Public performances were also banned for several months during the illness and the death of emperor Hirohito in 1989.

Present

Nowadays they are a rare sight in Japanese cities, and only 30–35 professional  still exist, mostly in and around Tokyo, with another 30 amateur and hobby  performing at festivals. In recent years, however, there seems to be a very small increase again, as they can draw on their historic roots to evoke nostalgia. The social status of the performers has also improved. Thus, while far away from their golden days,  hold a small niche in the advertising business in Japan. In Osaka, for example,  performs for clothing stores, politicians, beauty salons, and restaurants, in addition to stage performances at weddings, company parties, and other events. They expand their traditional roles even further and even provide a sort of religious services based on old folk rituals, even though they are not in any way priests. They have also performed outside Japan. Another group, Adachi in Fukuoka Prefecture, was formed five years ago and is still doing business, including new attractions, such as playing the saxophone while riding the unicycle, displaying juggling, and balloon modelling performances.

Since 1955, a national contest of  bands has been held in Toyama-shi. Each April, dozens of groups join together to perform and compete.

Many  also use the internet to advertise for their services.

Performance
 are a small number of artists and musicians, both male and female. They are made up of usually at least three people, with some larger groups including 7 people. Some references call the  the group leader, while other references call the  the group leader. He is followed by one or more  that play wind instruments.

 dress in colorful clothes, usually in an eccentric version of traditional Japanese clothing. Women may be dressed in the traditional style, wearing brightly-colored kimono and a traditionally-styled wig, as well as heavy  makeup. Men usually wear their hair in a top knot, although nowadays they are usually wigs, and some may wear fancy hats. They parade through the streets playing various instruments, including both traditional Japanese instruments and western instruments. Usually, one person carries a combined instrument consisting of a small gong (giving the  sound in ) and two small drums (giving the  sound in ). Additional instruments by other performers may include a larger drum and a woodwind instrument, as for example a clarinet, a trumpet or a saxophone. They often play traditional Japanese tunes, military marches, or jazz.

Through their performance they try to attract attention to themselves, and more importantly, to the advertising signs and banners they are carrying. These may be boards hanging on the back of the performers or banners and flags hanging from large poles on the back of the performers. Some even carried umbrellas with advertising messages. They advertise for new shops, special sales in shops, the opening of a gaming parlor or pachinko parlors, or for cabarets. They may also distribute flyers.

Nowadays, a performer earns around ¥15,000 per day (roughly US$150), working from around 10:30 to 17:00. Hence a typical group of three to four people costs around ¥45,000 to ¥60,000 per day (roughly $450 to $600). Only an estimated 10%-20% of the acts are ordered by shops, most performances are at festivals and private parties.

Language references
It references to the commonly held view that  were very low status, very poor and, therefore, untrustworthy.

References

A yen for the traditional: in modern Japan, street performers sell ritual and nostalgia to compete with high-tech advertising
Chindonya: Ein aussterbendes Gewerbe in der japanischen Werbelandschaft (German)

External links

National Japanese chindon competition in Toyama-shi
The sunny side of the street 
Interview with a Chindonya
Chindonya group U-Stage
Chindonya group Yamatoya (in Japanese)
New York City Chindonya group HappyFunSmile
Okinawanpop & Chindon group Ryukyu Chimdon Gakudan (in Okinawa Japan)

Advertising in Japan
Japanese music
Street artists
Articles containing video clips